Bobbili is the historical town in Vizianagaram district, Andhra Pradesh.

Battle of Bobbili is the war of 18th century fought between Bobbili and Vizianagaram kingdoms.

Bobbili (Lok Sabha constituency) is an Indian parliamentary constituency.

 Bobbili Brahmanna is a 1984 Telugu film.
 Bobbili Puli is a 1982 Telugu film.
 Bobbili Raja is a 1990 Telugu film.
 Bobbili Yudham is a 1964 Telugu historical film.

See also 

 Bobili